The Britomart-class gunboat was a class of sixteen gunboats built for the Royal Navy in 1859–1867.

Design
The Britomart class was an improved version of the  designed by W.H. Walker, and as such comes under the generic group "Crimean gunboats" although this class was ordered and built long after the end of the Crimean War. These were the last Royal Navy gunboats to have wooden hulls: subsequent gunboats were of composite construction, with wooden planking over iron frames.

Propulsion
The class were fitted with a single-cylinder single-expansion reciprocating steam engine. The engines for Britomart and Cockatrice were by John Penn and Sons; the engine builders for the other ships are not recorded. The single screw could be hoisted to give improved performance under sail.

Sail plan
The ships were provided with a three-masted barquentine rig, that is, with square sails on the foremast and fore-and-aft sails on the main and mizzen masts.

Armament
Early ships of the class were armed with two 68-pounder smooth bore muzzle loading cannon (as had been planned, but not implemented, for the Dapper class); but the Heron was fitted with two 112-pounder Armstrong guns. Later ships had two 64-pounder rifled muzzle-loading guns.

Ships

Citations

References

Gunboat classes
 Britomart
Gunboats of the Royal Navy